Tell Them Anything You Want: A Portrait of Maurice Sendak is a 2009 television documentary film directed by Lance Bangs and Spike Jonze about children's author Maurice Sendak.

Plot
Starting in 2003 Spike Jonze and his frequent collaborator Lance Bangs began to film a series of interviews with author Maurice Sendak. Sendak spoke about his youth, family, thoughts on death, and his career and some of the controversies that came from his books Where the Wild Things Are and In the Night Kitchen.

References

External links 

2009 television films
2009 films
2009 documentary films
2000s English-language films
American documentary television films
Documentary films about writers
Films directed by Spike Jonze
Films directed by Lance Bangs
Maurice Sendak
2000s American films